Baliza Hill is the conspicuous rocky hill rising to 40 m in the southeast extremity of Half Moon Island in the South Shetland Islands, Antarctica and surmounting Menguante Cove to the north-northwest, McFarlane Strait to the northeast and east, and Mugla Passage to the south.  The area was visited by early 19th century sealers operating from nearby Yankee Harbour.

The feature's name is descriptive (Spanish for ‘beacon’) and appeared in a 2000 publication following Argentine ornithological research on the island, and in the 2005 and 2009 Bulgarian maps of Livingston Island.

Location

Maps
 L.L. Ivanov et al. Antarctica: Livingston Island and Greenwich Island, South Shetland Islands. Scale 1:100000 topographic map. Sofia: Antarctic Place-names Commission of Bulgaria, 2005.
 L.L. Ivanov. Antarctica: Livingston Island and Greenwich, Robert, Snow and Smith Islands. Scale 1:120000 topographic map.  Troyan: Manfred Wörner Foundation, 2009.

References
 Cesar Garcia Esponda, Nestor Coria & Diego Montalti. Breeding birds at Half Moon Island, South Shetland Islands, Antarctica, 1995/96. Marine Ornithology, 2000, 28, pp. 59–62.

Hills of Livingston Island